Basketball has been a Pan Arab Games event since the first edition in 1953 in Alexandria, Egypt.

Men's tournaments

Medal summary

Women's tournaments

Medal summary

See also
Arab Basketball Championship
Arab Women's Basketball Championship

External links
 Basketball at the Pan Arab Games - goalzz.com
 135 medals and counting - Al-Ahram Weekly

 
Sports at the Pan Arab Games
Pan Arab Games
Pan Arab Games
Pan Arab Games